Westonbirt, The National Arboretum is an arboretum in Gloucestershire, England, about  southwest of the town of Tetbury. Managed by Forestry England, it is perhaps the most important and widely known arboretum in the United Kingdom.

Planted in the heyday of Victorian plant hunting in the mid-19th century as part of the Westonbirt House estate, the arboretum forms part of a site which is listed Grade I on the Register of Historic Parks and Gardens of special historic interest.

History 
There is evidence of coppicing at the site from 1292. First use of the name "" was in 1309. This was taken from Weston, a settlement to the west of Bowldown Road, and Birt from then lords of the manor, the Bret family.

The arboretum was established in 1829 by Robert Stayner Holford and was later extended by his son George Lindsay Holford. After the death of George in 1926, ownership of the arboretum passed to his nephew, the fourth Earl of Morley, and eventually to the Forestry Commission in 1956 and Forestry England in 2019. The Holford family's mansion, Westonbirt House, became a girls' boarding school in 1927 when it was separated from the arboretum. Westonbirt Arboretum backs onto the Highgrove Estate of Charles III.

Today 

Its 17 miles (27 km) of marked paths are popular with visitors, and provide access to a wide variety of rare plants. There are two main areas to explore. The Old Arboretum is a carefully designed landscape offering beautiful vistas, stately avenues, and a host of rare and exotic trees from across the globe dating back to the 1850s. Silk Wood is a very different experience: although it also contains many exotic plantings, at its heart is a traditional working woodland, dating back to the 13th century. Dogs are welcome in Silk Wood but not allowed in The Old Arboretum.

Throughout the arboretum, each specimen tree is labelled, either on the trunk or a low-hanging branch. Blue labels indicate Westonbirt's "champion trees", the tallest or largest of their kind in Britain; in 2011 there were 79 of these.

The arboretum is managed by Forestry England, which also manages Bedgebury Pinetum in Kent. Westonbirt Arboretum is supported by the Friends of Westonbirt Arboretum, a registered charity which formed in 1985.

Location

Music and Festivals 
From 2003 to 2005 the arboretum hosted Britain's first designer-led garden festival: Westonbirt Festival of the Garden.

On 16 July 2011, Irish vocal pop band Westlife held a concert for Gravity Tour supporting their album Gravity.

Also in 2011, Treefest was launched. Following several successful years of the Festival of the Tree event, Westonbirt Arboretum refreshed the popular August bank holiday event with camping, music and more activities celebrating trees and nature.

Christmas and the spectacle of bare, sculpted trees in winter is celebrated at the Enchanted Christmas event. From the end of November and throughout December, an evening illuminated trail runs throughout the Old Arboretum, highlighting the beauty of Westonbirt's trees in winter.

References

External links

Friends of Westonbirt Arboretum
The Westonbirt map – interactive map with ability to search for and highlight particular species
Images of Westonbirt Arboretum at monumentaltrees.com

1829 establishments in England
Arboreta in England
Botanical gardens in England
Grade I listed parks and gardens in Gloucestershire
Tourist attractions in Gloucestershire
Cotswolds